South West Water provides drinking water and waste water services throughout Devon and Cornwall and in small areas of Dorset and Somerset. South West Water was created in 1989 with the privatisation of the water industry. It was preceded by the South West Water Authority which was formed by the Water Act 1973 as one of ten regional water authorities formed by a merger of various statutory and local authority water undertakings. South West Water is part of the Pennon Group.

History
South West Water was formed in 1989 when the water industry in the United Kingdom was privatised. It is responsible for the supply of the region's drinking water, the treatment and disposal of sewage, and the protection of inland and bathing waters. It is closely regulated by Ofwat, the Water Services Regulation Authority, being required to conform to stringent United Kingdom and European Union standards. Water from the Littlehampston treatment works, which serves about 162,000 customers in the Torbay area of Devon, has on three separate occasions been contaminated by the dangerous cryptosporidium parasite.  In July 1988 the water supply to Camelford, served by the Lowermoor treatment works, was severely contaminated by aluminium sulphate. Many people had medical issues after this and some died.

SWW is part of the Pennon Group.

The following public utilities were taken over by the South West Water Authority in 1973:
Cornwall River Authority
Devon River Authority
Avon and Dorset River Authority†
Plymouth County Borough Corporation
East Cornwall Water Board
East Devon Water Board
North and Mid Cornwall Water Board
North Devon Water Board
South Cornwall Water Board
South West Devon Water Board
West Cornwall Water Board

† Only the area of the authority which drained into the River Lim.

It was the subject of an episode of the fly-on-the-wall documentary Back to the Floor in 1997.

Activities
The main source of the water supplied by South West Water is the twenty reservoirs they own, with 90% of the water coming from reservoirs and rivers. The company makes great efforts to keep the water clean while allowing access to the public for sport and recreation. Upper Tamar Lake has facilities for angling and watersports, and is used by a number of local clubs including fishing and model yachting clubs. The South West Lakes Trust is a charitable organisation that manages fifty inland water sites across Cornwall, Devon and West Somerset, attracting around two million  visitors annually.

See also
Water Industry Act 1991
Surfers against Sewage

References

External links

South West Water on Thewaterplace.co.uk

Water companies of England
Companies based in Exeter
1989 establishments in England
Former nationalised industries of the United Kingdom